Lestes ictericus is a species of damselfly in the family Lestidae, the spreadwings. It is known by the common names tawny spreadwing and yellow spreadwing. It is native to much of eastern and western Africa. It lives near seasonal pools in savanna habitat.

References

Icter
Odonata of Africa
Insects described in 1869
Taxonomy articles created by Polbot